Yuzhnaya is a rural locality (a village) in Russko-Yurmashsky Selsoviet, Ufimsky District, Bashkortostan, Russia. The population was 7 as of 2010. There is 1 street.

Geography 
Yuzhnaya is located 25 km southeast of Ufa (the district's administrative centre) by road. Shmidtovo is the nearest rural locality.

References 

Rural localities in Ufimsky District